Gaylussacia pulchra is a plant species in the family Ericaceae. It is native to the States of Bahia and Minas Gerais in eastern Brazil.

Gaylussacia pulchra is a woody, branching shrub. Leaves are lance-shaped, dark green on the upper surface, whitish on the underside. Flowers are scarlet, tubular, in axillary racemes. Fruits have 10 chambers, each with one seed.

References

pulchra
Endemic flora of Brazil
Flora of Bahia
Flora of Minas Gerais
Berries
Plants described in 1828
Taxa named by Carl Meissner